Michael A. O'Donnell (born June 17, 1968) is an American politician serving as a member of the Missouri House of Representatives from the 95th district. Elected in November 2018, he assumed office in January 2019.

Early life and education 
O'Donnell was born in St. Louis and raised in Oakville, Missouri. After graduating from Lindbergh High School, he earned a Bachelor of Science degree in business administration from the University of Missouri–St. Louis and a Master of Science in military strategic intelligence from American Military University.

Career 
O'Donnell served as an intelligence officer in the United States Navy Reserve. During his tenure, he was deployed to Iraq and Afghanistan. O'Donnell later worked as a municipal bond trader for Wells Fargo. O'Donnell was in New York City during the September 11 attacks and was scheduled to attend a business meeting on the 104th floor of the World Trade Center. O'Donnell was elected to the Missouri House of Representatives in November 2018 and assumed office in January 2019. He also serves as vice chair of the House Financial Institutions Committee.

Electoral History

References 

1968 births
Living people
Republican Party members of the Missouri House of Representatives
People from St. Louis County, Missouri
University of Missouri–St. Louis alumni